Armada Asset Management, LLC is a business conglomerate holding company providing asset management services, consulting, and threat reduction/security services. Their main office is located in Newport Beach, CA, with operational locations in Pleasant Grove, UT, Copperas Cove, TX, Hattiesburg, MS, Hampton Roads, VA, and Washington, D.C. Armada Asset Management is a Service-Disabled Veteran-Owned Small Business that bids primarily on low-budget defense contracts relating to military and operational consulting.

Corporate structure

Armada Asset Management, LLC has five business units:

Consulting
Armada Consulting provides consulting services in the areas of operations, business development, management, best practices, supply chain management, logistics, operational integrity, real estate acquisition, real estate development, and force protection services.

Management
Armada Management is a relatively small property management company that offers mid- to high-end residential properties in California, Texas, Mississippi, Utah, and Virginia.

Investment and Development
Armada Investment is a subsidiary that offers liability-based consulting services that seek to reduce liability. This is different from financial service providers who specifically discuss financial investments; which Armada Investment does not.

Armada Development provides construction-based services to companies and individuals in the Virginia and Washington, DC areas. Working primarily under contracted conditions, Armada Development provides onsite management, labor, permit registration, and ongoing oversight for various projects.

Landscaping
Armada Landscaping offers landscaping services in Southern Maryland to residential and commercial locations.

Defense and Security Services
Armada Defense offers Defense, Protection, and Security services for the military and private sectors. Armada Defense claims to be able to put defense contractors anywhere in the world “within hours” of notification, but these claims have been widely disputed within the Louisiana Department of Transportation and Development. Under the umbrella of defense services, Armada also offers post-war and post-disaster reconstruction management oversight, consulting, and logistical support. The majority of the company's time is spent preparing for the reconstruction of Iraq and Afghanistan as stated in an interview with the Army Times on October 6, 2009 at the Association of The United States Army 2009 Annual Conference in Washington, DC.

References 

Investment management companies of the United States
Financial services companies based in California
Holding companies of the United States
Companies based in Newport Beach, California
Financial services companies established in 2003
Holding companies established in 2003
2003 establishments in California
2003 establishments in the United States
Companies established in 2003